The 2012 season will be Melbourne Heart's first season in the F-League.

Players

Note: Flags indicate national team as has been defined under FIFA eligibility rules. Players may hold more than one non-FIFA nationality.

2012 hummel F-League

Kick-off times are in AEDT

Results

Results by round

References

External links
 F-League website
 Melbourne Heart Futsal Club website

Futsal in Australia